The 50 elected members of the Parliament of Fiji from 2014 to 2018 were elected on 17 September 2014.

List of MPs

References

 2014